The Professional Basketball League of America (1947–1948) was a basketball league in the United States that was started in 1947 in response to the tremendous upsurge in interest in basketball in the era immediately following World War II. The organization was underfunded compared to its competitors—the Basketball Association of America, the National Basketball League, and even the American Basketball League; there was simply not room in the marketplace for four major professional basketball leagues. The PBLA folded without completing its only season.

Teams

Northern Division
Chicago Gears (8-0)           
 St. Paul Saints   (6-3)         
 Grand Rapids Rangers
Louisville Colonels 
 Omaha Tomahawks          
 Kansas City Blues              
Waterloo Pro-Hawks
 St. Joseph Outlaws          

Southern Division
 Houston Mavericks        
 Atlanta Crackers 
 Birmingham Skyhawks
 Tulsa Ranchers      
 Chattanooga Majors                
 Oklahoma City Drillers
 New Orleans Hurricanes      
 Springfield Squires

References

 
Defunct basketball leagues in the United States
1947 establishments in the United States
1948 disestablishments in the United States